Aagot or Ågot is a feminine Norwegian given name. Notable people with the name include:

Aagot Børseth (1898–1993), Norwegian actress
Aagot Didriksen (1874–1968), Norwegian actress
Aagot Nissen (1882–1978), Norwegian actress
Aagot Norman (1892–1979), Norwegian swimmer
Aagot Raaen (1873–1957), American writer and educator
Ågot Valle (born 1945), Norwegian politician
Aagot Vinterbo-Hohr (born 1936), Norwegian physician and writer

See also
Aagot (1882), a shipwreck of South Australia

Norwegian feminine given names